Spandaryan is a village in the Gorayk Municipality of the Syunik Province in Armenia. The area around the village contains the Spandaryan Hydro Power Plant, one of Armenia's largest hydro power plants and the Spandaryan Reservoir to the northwest of the village itself.

Toponymy 
The village was previously known as Meliklar, Maliklar, Meliklu and Kalachik.

Demographics

Population 
The Statistical Committee of Armenia reported its population was 486 in 2010, up from 446 at the 2001 census.

Gallery

References 

Populated places in Syunik Province